Rich Forever 3 is the fourth compilation mixtape by American record label, Rich Forever Music, released on June 16, 2017. The mixtape was delayed multiple times. The production was handled by The Lab Cook, Richie Souf, Laron & 808Shawty. It is the third mixtape of the Rich Forever series.

Rich Forever 3 debuted at number 93 on the US Billboard 200.

Track listing

References

2017 mixtape albums
Trap music albums